Federal Route 254 (formerly Penang state route P12 and Kedah state route K12) is a federal road in Penang and Kedah state, Malaysia. The Kilometre Zero is at Kulim, Kedah.

Features
At most sections, the Federal Route 254 was built under the JKR R5 road standard, allowing maximum speed limit of up to 90 km/h.

List of junctions

References

Malaysian Federal Roads